Days of Future Past is an X-Men comic book storyline.

Days of Future Past may also refer to:

 "Days of Future Past", an episode of the animated television series X-Men
 X-Men: Days of Future Past, a 2014 science-fiction superhero film based on the comics storyline
 Days of Future Passed, a 1967 album by the Moody Blues
 A song on the album 2021 Senjutsu by Iron Maiden